Huanbei is the site of a Bronze Age city on the northern outskirts of the modern city of Anyang in Henan province, China, discovered in 1999. The name refers to its position to the north (běi) of the Huan River. The city seems to have been burnt to the ground after 50 years of occupation, shortly before the construction on the other side of the river of the site now known as Yinxu, the source of the earliest Chinese written records, oracle bones relating to the last nine kings of the Shang dynasty. Huanbei is accordingly assigned to a "Middle Shang" period.

Artifacts had been recovered from the area since the 1960s.  In 1999, a walled city eight feet beneath the surface was discovered in the course of a regional survey undertaken by the Institute of Archaeology at the Chinese Academy of Social Sciences and the Archaeometry Laboratory at the University of Minnesota. The city has since been excavated by joint teams from Institute of Archaeology at the Chinese Academy of Social Sciences, the University of Minnesota, the University of Wisconsin and the University of British Columbia.

Part of the site lies under Anyang's airport, limiting the scope of excavations.

References

 
 
 
 
 
 

Archaeological sites in China
Ancient Chinese cities
Chinese architectural history
Shang dynasty
Buildings and structures in Henan
Anyang
14th-century BC establishments